Hermann Christian Polster (born 8 April 1937) is a German opera singer (bass).

Life 
Born in Leipzig, the son of the concert singer and singing teacher Fritz Polster, he received his first education from his father. He was a member of the Dresdner Kreuzchor. He received his first voice training at the Leipzig University by the musicologist Heinrich Besseler.

Polster began his solo career in Leipzig and soon became an esteemed Bach interpreter. He performed together with the Thomanerchor, whose vocal teacher he was for many years, and made concert tours through Eastern and Western Europe. In addition to Baroque, Classical and Romantic music, he also sang modern works. He was also an esteemed song interpreter. His first opera role was in 1966 as Lord Syndham in Lortzing's Zar und Zimmermann at the Leipzig Opera. Since then he has appeared in many guest roles, as Sarastro in The Magic Flute, as Pogner in the Die Meistersinger von Nürnberg and as Gremin in Eugene Onegin. The main focus of his artistic activity, however, remained primarily on oratorio singing.

Polster was awarded the Kammersänger title and was professor of singing at the University of Music and Theatre Leipzig. In 1978 he was awarded the Art Prize of the German Democratic Republic.

Today he devotes himself above all to the education and professional profiling of young singers with a focus on oratorio and art song. His pedagogical success is based on many years of extensive practical international singing and artistic experience and many years of pedagogical activity.

In 1969, Polster married Ute Lehmann; she was vice world champion in 1967 World Rhythmic Gymnastics Championships. His wife died in 1994.

Recordings 
 Franz Schubert: Mass No. 2 for soprano, tenor, bass, choir, string and organ: D 167, Berlin Classics (1998)

References

External links 
 Hermann Christian Polster on Operissimo
 
 W.A. Mozart - O Isis und Osiris (YouTube)

1937 births
Living people
Musicians from Leipzig
German basses
Academic staff of the University of Music and Theatre Leipzig
German music educators
20th-century German male singers